Rubellatoma rufocincta  is a species of sea snail, a marine gastropod mollusk in the family Mangeliidae.

Description
The length of the shell attains 8 mm, its diameter 3 mm.

Distribution
This marine species occurs in the Atlantic Ocean off Porto Cavalho, Brazil.

References

   Smith, E.A. (1882) Diagnoses of new species of Pleurotomidae in the British Museum. Annals and Magazine of Natural History, series 5, 10, 206–218

External links
 

rufocincta
Gastropods described in 1882